General elections were held in Botswana on 15 October 1994, alongside simultaneous local elections. The result was a victory for the Botswana Democratic Party (BDP), which had won every election since 1965. However, the elections also saw a strong performance from the Botswana National Front (BNF), which tripled its number of MPs and won all four seats in the capital Gaborone.

Background
Following the 1991 census, constituency boundaries were redrawn and six new constituencies were created. Five of these were in urban areas, which was deemed to be a more realistic apportionment of constituencies; Gaborone gained three, Francistown one and Lobatse became a new constituency.

Campaign
The elections were contested by a record nine parties, with a total of 108 candidates running. The BNF considered boycotting the elections after the government refused to reform the electoral system or reduce the voting age from 21, but eventually contested the elections due to the belief that the government was vulnerable.

The BDP campaigned on its record of economic and political stability, whilst the BNF campaign centred on high rent and utility costs, as well as unemployment.

Results

The four indirectly elected members were elected on 26 October by members of the National Assembly, based on a list of eight candidates produced by President Ketumile Masire.

Aftermath
Following the elections, the National Assembly convened on 17 October to elect the President. Incumbent President Masire (BDP) was challenged by Kenneth Koma (BNF) and Knight Maripe (BPP). Masire was re-elected and inaugurated on 19 October. The new government was announced on 25 October.

References

Elections in Botswana
Botswana
1994 in Botswana
Election and referendum articles with incomplete results